Cockley may refer to:

Cockley Beck, a small hamlet, situated in the Duddon Valley in Cumbria, England
Cockley Cley, a village and civil parish in the English county of Norfolk
Burt Cockley (born 1986), Australian cricketer who has played for New South Wales and Western Australia
David L. Cockley (1843–1901), American soldier who fought in the American Civil War

See also

Cockle (disambiguation)
Cocky (disambiguation)
Ockley, Surrey, England